The West London Lifelong Learning Network is a government funded partnership.

It aims to increase the number of vocational learners progressing to and through Higher Education using flexible learning, and respond to employers’ skills shortages.

The West London Lifelong Learning Network is committed to joint working with its academic partners and employers to help achieve its goals.

Focus 

Its activities centre around three West London priority areas:
 Health & Social Care 
 Heathrow (travel and tourism, hospitality and catering, retail, logistics, aeronautical engineering, environmental sustainability, business and IT services) 
 Science, Technology, Engineering & Mathematics.

Partners

The West London Lifelong Learning Network's academic partners are:
 Brunel University
 Capel Manor College
 College of North West London
 Ealing, Hammersmith and West London College
 Harrow College
 Kingston University
 Royal Holloway, University of London
 St Dominic's Sixth Form College
 Stanmore College
 Thames Valley University
 Uxbridge College
 West Thames College
 University of Westminster
 William Morris Sixth Form

See also 
 Higher Education Funding Council for England
 Lifelong Learning Networks (LLNs)

External links 
 West London Lifelong Learning Network

Education in London
Vocational education in the United Kingdom